The 2005 Brabantse Pijl was the 45th edition of the Brabantse Pijl cycle race and was held on 27 March 2005. The race started in Zaventem and finished in Alsemberg. The race was won by Óscar Freire.

General classification

References

2005
Brabantse Pijl